Silja Walter (23 April 1919 – 31 January 2011) was a Swiss author and Benedictine nun in the Fahr Abbey in Switzerland. Born as Cécile Walter in Rickenbach, Solothurn, in Switzerland, at the age of 30 she became a nun: her religious name was Maria Hedwig (OSB). Her brother, Otto F. Walter, was also a popular Swiss author.

Biography 
Cécile "Silja" Walter's father Otto was the founder of the Walter Verlag publishing house, writer and member of the Swiss National Council, her mother, Maria Anna Cäcilia Walter-Glutz, wrote lyrics for domestic use. Silja was the second oldest of eight daughters, her only brother was the writer Otto F. Walter (1928–1994). Silja Walter studied five years at a teachers' training college and began her studies of literature at the University of Fribourg. Due to a life-threatening lung disease, she had to break. In 1944 her first poetry collection "Die ersten Gedichte" was published; as relatively popular author, in 1948 she joined the Benedictine convent of Fahr Abbey.

Work and reputation 
Silja Walter's work of about 60 publications includes poetry and prose, as well as festivals, oratorios and theological texts reflecting her life as nun. Silja Walter has received many awards, among them literary and cultural prices from the city of Zürich, by the Swiss Schiller Foundation in 1956 and 1992, and the art prize of the canton of Solothurn. Her book «Eine Insel finden» ("To find an island", 1984) was a best selling work, based on a radio show that confronted Silja Walter with her brother Otto F. Walter. The Walter siblings had a completely different literary activity: Her brother was a dedicated social critics, Silja Walter wrote lyrics "far away from the world" in a monastery. «Der Wolkenbaum» ("The tree in the clouds", 1992) was even more successful, reflecting Silja Walter's family history. In 2009, her biography was published, «Das dreifarbene Meer» ("The three-colored sea"), written probably on her computer: at the age of 80 she started to use computers, in 2010, she was allowed by the Prioress of the Fahr Abbey to use an Internet access.

On 23 April 2016 the Silja-Walter-Raum at the Fahr Abbey was inaugurated. The monastery would appeal to people who knew the artist's work, but also for the younger generation, said Prioress Irene on occasion of an interview. Sister Maria Hedwig's literal work is inextricably linked to the Benedictine nunnery where she lived for over 60 years. During this time, Silja Walter wrote most of her literary work. After the renovation of the provost's room, its former office with its beautiful stucco ceiling was chosen to establish a small museum. It contains numerous texts, film, audio and photographic documents, as well as excerpts from the radio interview from 1982, when Silja Walter and her brother, Otto F. Walter, recorded the interview tape Eine Insel (An Island). But also personal objects like the nun's typewriter are exhibited, and also the lesser known drawings and painting of the artist. For now, the room will be open every last Sunday of the month after the worship service from approximately 10:45 to 14:00; admission is free. Silja Walter's complete work was published posthumously in by so far 11 volumes.

Awards 
 1956: Literaturpreis und Kulturpreis Stadt Zürich
 1992: Literaturpreis und Kulturpreis Stadt Zürich
 2011: Gesamtwerkspreis Schweizerische Schillerstiftung
 2011: Kunstpreis Kanton Solothurn

Selected works 

Die ersten Gedichte, 1944
Gedichte, 1950
Wettinger Sternsingerspiel, 1955
Die hereinbrechende Auferstehung, 1960
Der Tanz des Gehorsams oder die Strohmatte, 1970
Die Schleuse oder Abteien aus Glas. Ein Roman, 1972
Jan, der Verrückte. Ein Spiel, 1978
Ruf und Regel. Erfahrungen des Glaubens im benediktinischen Kloster, 1980
Eine Insel finden. Gespräch mit Otto F. Walter, 1983
Die Feuertaube. Neue Gedichte. Für meinen Bruder, 1985
Voll singenden Feuers. Eine Auswahl aus ihren Werken, 1990
Der Wolkenbaum. Meine Kindheit im alten Haus, 1992
Die Beichte im Zeichen des Fisches. Ein geistliches Tagebuch, 1999
Die Fähre legt sich hin am Strand. Ein Lesebuch, 1999
Ich habe meine Insel gefunden. Geheimnis im Alltag, 2006
Er pflückte sie vom Lebensbaum. Ein benediktinisches Tagebuch, 2008
Das dreifarbene Meer. Meine Heilsgeschichte – eine Biographie, 2009

References

Further reading 
 Eve Pormeister: Grenzgängerinnen. Gertrud Leutenegger und die schreibende Nonne Silja Walter aus der Schweiz. SAXA Verlag, Berlin 2010, .
 Simon Peng-Keller (publisher): Aufbruchsfreude und Geistesgegenwart. Gestalten einer erneuerten christlichen Spiritualität. Theologischer Verlag (Edition NZN/TVZ), Zürich 2007, .
 Ulrike Wolitz: Der neue Mensch. Theologische Grundlinien im Werk Silja Walters. Universitätsverlag (Praktische Theologie im Dialog 17), Fribourg 1998, .
 Otto F. Walter: Eine Insel finden. Gespräch zwischen Otto F. Walter und Silja Walter. Moderiert und mit Vorwort von Philippe Dätwyler. Arche, Zürich 1983, .

External links 
 
 Silja Walter on the website of the Fahr Abbey 
 Silja Walter on orden-online.de 

1919 births
2011 deaths
People from Olten District
Swiss poets in German
Benedictine nuns
Benedictine writers
Swiss Benedictines
Swiss women novelists
20th-century Swiss poets
20th-century Swiss novelists
Swiss women poets
20th-century women writers
20th-century Swiss women writers
21st-century Swiss women writers
21st-century Swiss poets
21st-century Swiss novelists
Swiss writers in German
20th-century Roman Catholic nuns
21st-century Roman Catholic nuns